Wayne Johnson is an American politician who served as the 27th Auditor of New Mexico. A Republican, he had previously represented the 5th district on the Bernalillo County Board of County Commissioners from 2010 to 2017.

Johnson was a candidate for Mayor of Albuquerque in 2017.

References

External links
 NM State Auditor
 Campaign website

21st-century American politicians
County commissioners in New Mexico
Living people
New Mexico Republicans
Politicians from Albuquerque, New Mexico
State auditors of New Mexico
University of New Mexico alumni
Year of birth missing (living people)